Sport Bild is a German weekly sports magazine published in Hamburg, Germany.

History and profile
Sport Bild was established in 1988. It is published weekly every Wednesday. The magazine has its headquarters in Hamburg and is published by Axel Springer AG. The magazine covers news about all types of sport, but its major focus is on football.

In 2001 Sport Bild had a circulation of 512,000 copies. The circulation of magazine was 437,516 copies in 2010. Its average circulation was 421,200 copies in 2012 in Germany.

See also
 List of magazines in Germany

References

External links
 Official website 

1988 establishments in West Germany
Axel Springer SE
German-language magazines
Magazines established in 1988
Magazines published in Hamburg
Sports magazines published in Germany
Weekly magazines published in Germany